is a town located in Higashiusuki District, Miyazaki Prefecture, Japan.

The town was formed on January 1, 2006 from the merger of the villages of Kitagō, Nangō and Saigō, all from Higashiusuki District.

As of October 1, 2019, the town has an estimated population of 4,823, with 2,292 households and the population density of 10.7 persons per km². The total area is 448.84 km².

Geography

Climate
Misato has a humid subtropical climate (Köppen climate classification Cfa) with hot, humid summers and cool winters.

Demographics
Per Japanese census data, the population of Misato in 2020 is 4,826 people. Misato has been conducting censuses since 1920.

Local attraction 
Museum of Baekje in Misato and West Shosoin in Misato, both built in 1996, as part of the tourism partnership in Japan and South Korea.

Transportation

Highways 

 Japan National Route 327
 Japan National Route 388
 Japan National Route 446

References

External links

 Misato official website 
 Misato official website 

Towns in Miyazaki Prefecture